The 1951 Wisconsin Badgers football team represented the University of Wisconsin in the 1951 Big Ten Conference football season. Led by third-year head coach Ivy Williamson, the Badgers compiled an overall record of 7–1–1 with a mark of 5–1–1 in conference play, placing third in the Big Ten. Hal Faverty was the team's MVP and Jim Hammond was team's captain.

Schedule

References

Wisconsin
Wisconsin Badgers football seasons
Wisconsin Badgers football